Pazol is a surname.  It is mostly attributed to a spelling variation of the shtetl, Pazelva near Želva in Lithuania, located at 55°13' / 25°06'.  Named Pazelva in Yiddish, the common language of its residents, its name is Podzelva in Hebrew. Želva is 14 miles east of the city Ukmergė. Maps indicate that nearby is a location named Pazelviai.

Due to Nazi extermination of Jews during World War II, residents of Pazelva who had not already emigrated were killed.

Distribution of persons bearing the Pazol surname includes the US, Puerto Rico and Israel.

Pronunciation of the name has a wide variation.  Spelling variations include Pazel, Bazall, Basil, and Pasel.

Notes

Surnames